The village of Air Papan is a seaside area with a  long beach set in between the hills in Mersing District, Johor, Malaysia.

Other than a few properties and a mosque in the village beach-side area the remainder are dotted around the area.

Every 1 May the "Pesta Air Papan" (Air Papan Festival) is celebrated featuring cultural shows, games, food etc.

References

Mersing District
Villages in Johor